Naveena Sarangadhara (நவீன சாரங்கதாரா) is a 1936 Tamil film directed by K. Subramaniam under Murugan Talkies. Naveena in Tamil means modern. The film was titled thus in order to distinguish itself from the earlier versions and also in order to highlight the slight modifications made to the original story. The cast includes M. K. Thyagaraja Bhagavathar and S. D. Subbulakshmi in the lead roles supported by S. S. Mani Bhagavathar, G. Pattu Iyer and Indubala. The music was composed by Papanasam Sivan.

Cast 

 M. K. Thyagaraja Bhagavathar
 S. D. Subbulakshmi 
 S. S. Mani Bhagavathar
 G. Pattu Iyer 
 Indubala

Production 
The film has 41 songs. Most of the songs are sung by Thyagaraja Bhagavathar and Subbulakshmi.

Soundtrack 
All of the songs' lyrics were written and composed by Papanasam Sivan.

References

Bibliography 
 Dhananjayan, G.

1936 films
1930s Tamil-language films
Indian black-and-white films
Films scored by Papanasam Sivan